Puzhai Farm is a township enterprise located south of Puzhai Town in Fengshun County, Meizhou City, Guangdong Province, China.

See also 
List of township-level divisions of Guangdong

References

External links 
Official website of the Fengshun County Government

Township-level divisions of Guangdong
Fengshun County